Lapo Pistelli (born 20 June 1964, in Florence) is an Italian politician and Member of the (Chamber of Deputies) of the Italian Parliament, elected for the Italian Democratic Party. In the Italian Democratic Party is the Head of the Foreign Affairs and International Relations Department.

He is the son of Nicola Pistelli (1929–64), a Christian Democrat politician.

Biography

Graduated in Political Science and International Relations at the University of Florence (1988), Pistelli started his political career in the Christian Democracy (Democrazia Cristiana) as Responsible for the foreign affairs office of the Christian Democrat Youth Movement (1987–1991) becoming, in the following years, Member of the secretariat and directorate (1995–1999) and coordinator of the national secretariat (1999–2001) of the Italian People's Party (Partito Popolare), and member of the executive and official responsible for foreign affairs (2001–2004) of the Democracy is Freedom – The Daisy (La Margherita) party.

In 1996, after serving as municipal councillor of Florence (1990–1995), he is elected as a Member of the Chamber of Deputies of Italy with The Olive Tree political coalition (l'Ulivo) (1996–2001), and is confirmed Deputy also in the subsequent legislature (2001–2004), operating as a member of the Committee on Foreign Affairs and member of the OSCE Parliamentary Assembly (2001–2004).

In 2004 he is elected as a member of the European Parliament (2004–2008), where he serves both as Head of the Italian Delegation, as the vice-chairman of the Alliance of Liberals and Democrats for Europe and as a member of two Committees (Foreign Affairs and Financial and Economic Affairs).

In 2007, with the foundation of the Italian Democratic Party (Partito Democratico), becomes member of the national executive of the Party with the role of responsible for Foreign Affairs, and in 2008 he is elected to the Italian Parliament. At present, he is member of the III Committee (Foreign Affairs) of the Chamber of Deputies.

Activities

Member of the Florence Faculty of the Bing Overseas Studies of Stanford University, he lectured in various universities around the globe. In Italy, he is a member of the Board of the IAI (International Affairs Institute) and of the Institute for Relations of Italy with Africa, Latin America, and the Middle and Far East. He is also a member of the Council Italy-United States and of the Board of Editors of East (European and Asian Strategies) and continues to cooperate with a number of progressive think tanks such as Policy Network in London, The Center for American Progress and Brookings Institution in Washington, the Foundation IDEAS in Madrid, the European Council on Foreign Relations. He has been Vice President of the Italy-USA Foundation from 2008 to 2010. A journalist since 1991, he publishes regularly in various newspapers on issues related to European and international affairs and on specialized magazines like Aspenia and Limes. His publications include Semestre nero: Berlusconi e la politica estera ("Black semester: Berlusconi and Italian Foreign Policy"), 2004; and America Take Away, 2006.

References

Books

Lapo Pistelli; Franco Monaco, Luigi Pizzolato. Giorgio La Pira: speranza e profezia cristiana nel 20º anniversario della morte ("Giorgio La Pira: hope and christian prophecy in the 20th anniversary of his death"), In Dialogo, 1998. 
Lapo Pistelli; Matteo Renzi. Ma le giubbe rosse non-uccisero Aldo Moro ("But the Red Shirts did not kill Aldo Moro"), Donzelli, 1999. 
Lapo Pistelli; Enrico Letta. Il boomerang. Lo stato sociale visto dai giovani ("The boomerang. The welfare seen by the youth"), Donzelli, 2001. 
Lapo Pistelli; Guelfo Fiore. Semestre nero. Berlusconi e la politica estera ("Black semester. Berlusconi and Italian Foreign Policy"), Fazi Editore, 2004. 
Lapo Pistelli, America take away, Fazi Editore, 2006.

External links
Lapo Pistelli official blog (Italian)
Lapo Pistelli, Chamber of Deputies' website – XVI Legislation (Italian)
Lapo Pistelli, European Parliament website – 6th Parliamentary term
Lapo Pistelli, Chamber of Deputies' website – XIV Legislation (Italian)
Lapo Pistelli, Chamber of Deputies' website – XIII Legislation (Italian)

1964 births
Democratic Party (Italy) MEPs
Italian People's Party (1994) politicians
Democracy is Freedom – The Daisy politicians
Democratic Party (Italy) politicians
Living people
MEPs for Italy 2004–2009
21st-century Italian politicians
Politicians from Florence
University of Florence alumni